At least two warships of Japan have borne the name Abukuma:

 , was a  launched in 1923 and sunk in 1944.  Abukuma (阿武隈) was the sixth and last of the vessels completed for the Imperial Japanese Navy. She saw action during World War II in the Attack on Pearl Harbor and in the Pacific, before being disabled in the Battle of Surigao Strait in October 1944, then bombed and sunk by the United States Army Air Forces (USAAF) off the coast of the Philippines.
 , is an  launched in 1988

Japanese Navy ship names